Anomalomyrmini is a tribe of Leptanillinae ants with three extant genera.

Genera
 Anomalomyrma Taylor, 1990
 Furcotanilla Xu, 2012
 Protanilla Taylor, 1990

References

Leptanillinae
Ant tribes